This is a list of seasons played by RCD Espanyol in Spanish and European football. Established in 1900, the seasons from the beginning of La Liga in 1928 to the most recent completed season are mentioned. It details the club's achievements in major competitions, and the top scorers for each season.

The club has never won the Liga and won the Spanish Cup 4 times.

Key 

Key to league record:
 Pos = Final position
 P = Played
 W = Games won
 D = Games drawn
 L = Games lost
 GF = Goals for
 GA = Goals against
 GD = Goal difference
 Pts = Points

Key to rounds:
 W = Winner
 F = Final
 SF = Semi-finals
 QF = Quarter-finals
 R16 = Round of 16
 R32 = Round of 32
 R64 = Round of 64
 R5 = Fifth round
 R4 = Fourth round
 R3 = Third round
 R2 = Second round
 R1 = First round
 GS = Group stage

Key to competitions
 Cup = Copa Del Rey
 Sup = Supercopa / Copa Eva Duarte
 CL = UEFA Champions League / European Cup
 UC = UEFA Europa League / UEFA Cup
 CW = UEFA Cup Winners Cup
 SC = UEFA Supercup
 CWC = FIFA Club World Cup

Seasons

References 

Espanyol
 
Seasons
Seasons